Smit Internationale N.V. (or Smit International) is a Dutch company operating in the maritime sector. The company was founded in 1842 by Fop Smit as a towage company with only the 140 horsepower paddle steamer tug Kinderdijk.
Fop's sons, Jan and Leendert, continued the company under the name L. Smit & Co and expanded the fleet. In 1870, they began using tugs with propellers.
After a merger in 1923 with Internationale Sleepdienst, the name was changed to "L. Smit & Co.'s Internationale Sleepdienst". Formerly listed at the NYSE Euronext stock exchange in Amsterdam, the company was fully acquired by Royal Boskalis Westminster in 2010.

Takeover
Dutch marine engineer Boskalis made an indicative €1.11 billion takeover offer for Smit on 15 September 2008. Despite the offer being promptly rejected by Smit's board, Boskalis subsequently built a stake of over 25% in the firm and expressed a continuing desire to buy a number of its business units. A revised offer from Boskalis of €1.35 billion, coupled with a pledge to retain the Smit name and its distinct operations, was accepted by the firm's board in January 2010, with Boskalis declaring its offer unconditional that March having reached share ownership of 90%. Smit's shares were delisted from the Amsterdam Stock Exchange on 4 May 2010.

Corporate structure
The company consist of four divisions, in order of revenue:
Transport & Heavy Lift (33.5% of total revenues)
Salvage (23.9%)
Harbour Towage (22.8%)
Terminals (19.8%)

For larger (salvaging) projects the company often uses joint-ventures or combinations. A similar multi-firm arrangement was made for the 2013-2014 salvage of the Costa Concordia passenger cruise ship.

Fleet list
As of March 1, 2009, Smit (with its daughter companies and the joint ventures that it controls) has a fleet of 408 ships.

High profile operations
Its marine salvage division was involved in several high-profile salvage operations, including:
  (1971–72)
 MT Betelgeuse (1979–80)
  (1987)
 The Russian submarine Kursk (lifting vessel) (2000)
 Ehime Maru (2001)
 MV Prestige (2002)
  (lifting vessel) (2002–2003)
  (2004)
 MV Mighty Servant 3 (2006)
  (2008)
 MS Costa Concordia (oil containment) (2012)
  (grounded in Philippines) (2013)
 MOL Comfort sunk in June 2013.
  (2020)
 Ever Given blockage of the Suez Canal (2021)
 MV Eemslift Hendrika ship salvation (2021)

They have also partnered with the French firm JLMD System to support preinstalled fast oil recovery systems, which assure quick reliable oil removal in the event of a shipping accident.

References

External links

1842 establishments in the Netherlands
Companies based in Rotterdam
Logistics companies of the Netherlands
Marine salvage
2010 mergers and acquisitions
Transport companies established in 1842